is a passenger railway station in located in the city of Kinokawa, Wakayama Prefecture, Japan, operated by West Japan Railway Company (JR West).

Lines
Uchita Station is served by the Wakayama Line, and is located 69.8 kilometers from the terminus of the line at Ōji Station.

Station layout
The station consists of two opposed side platforms connected to the station building by a footbridge. The station is unattended.

Platforms

Adjacent stations

|-

History
Uchita Station opened on August 24, 1900 on the Kiwa Railway. The line was sold to the Kansai Railway in 1904, which was subsequently nationalized in 1907. With the privatization of the Japan National Railways (JNR) on April 1, 1987, the station came under the aegis of the West Japan Railway Company.

Passenger statistics
In fiscal 2019, the station was used by an average of 589 passengers daily (boarding passengers only).

Surrounding Area
Kinokawa City Hall (former Uchita Town Hall)
Kinokawa City Uchida Junior High School

See also
List of railway stations in Japan

References

External links

 Uchita Station Official Site

Railway stations in Wakayama Prefecture
Railway stations in Japan opened in 1900
Kinokawa, Wakayama